X Factor Indonesia is an Indonesian television music competition to find new singing talent; the winner of which receives a 1 billion rupiahs recording contract with Sony Music Indonesia. The first season was started on RCTI on December 28, 2012 and ended on May 24, 2013.

Fatin Shidqia was announced as the winner with debut single "Aku Memilih Setia", and Rossa emerged as the winning mentor.

Based on the UK format, the competition consists of auditions, in front of producers and then the judges with a live audience; bootcamp; judges' homes and then the live finals. Auditions for the show began in September 2012 and concluded in November 2012. The show was hosted by ex-VJ Robby Purba, while the judging panel consists of Ahmad Dhani, Rossa, Anggun and Bebi Romeo. Pop singer Mulan Jameela filled in for Anggun at the auditions while Anggun was performing in her Europe Live Tour Concert.

Judges and hosts

Many people were rumored to be in the running to join the judging panel, including Indra Lesmana, Titi DJ, Ahmad Dhani, Rossa, Titi Sjuman, Maia Estianty, Vina Panduwinata, Tompi, Anggun, Anang Hermansyah, Sherina Munaf, Agnes Monica, Ruth Sahanaya, Iwan Fals, Jaclyn Victor, Giring Ganesha and Bebi Romeo. On October 30, 2012, RCTI confirmed that Ahmad Dhani and Bebi Romeo will be the judges of this season by a commercial promo, with two remaining female judges still waiting for a confirmation. On November 12, reports surfaced that Rossa officially signed on to judge the show. It was also rumoured that Agnes Monica was in talks to be the judge. On November 16, Rossa has officially confirmed by her Twitter that she will joining as judge. On November 22 during the filming of the judges' auditions, it was announced that Indonesian-Born International Singer Anggun will be joining the show as a member of the judging panel. However, she missed the audition and bootcamp round due to her Europe Live Tour. Pop sensational singer Mulan Jameela filled in for Anggun as guest judge at the auditions.

Numerous people were speculated to host the series, including VJ Boy William and Daniel Mananta, host of Indonesian Idol. On November 23, 2012, ex-VJ Robby Purba was announced as host of the show.

Selection process

Auditions 
The producers' auditions began on September 29, 2012 at the State University of Medan in Medan, North Sumatra. More producers' auditions were held on October 3 at the Sasana Budaya Ganesha in Bandung, West Java, October 23 at the Balai Prajurit in Surabaya, East Java, November 6 at the Jogja Expo Center in Yogyakarta, Special Region of Yogyakarta and concluded on November 13–14 at the Jakarta International Expo in Jakarta, Jakarta Special Capital Region.

On October 22, 2012, RCTI announced that applicants could upload a video of them singing onto X Factor Indonesia website and it was opened for 5 days only (October 24–28). Selected applicants would appear in front of the judges.

The last set of auditions took place during November 22, 25-28, and December 1–4, 2012 at Studio 8 RCTI. These auditions individually occur simultaneously before both the judges and a live studio audience; and with such audience in attendance able to applaud/cheer approval or disapproval and perhaps influencing the judges.

Bootcamp 
Filming for bootcamp was held on December 18–20, 2012 in Studio 8 RCTI. As with the auditions, there was no sign of Anggun at bootcamp. The bootcamp stage was broadcast in two episodes on January 25 and February 1. The first day of bootcamp saw judges split the 119 acts into their four categories: Boys, Girls, Over-24s and Groups. They received vocal coaching and each category later performed one song: the Boys sang "Harus Terpisah" or "Hargai Aku", the Girls sang "Butiran Debu" or "Rindu", the Over-24s sang "Separuh Aku" or "Bunga Terakhir" and the Groups sang "Could It Be" or "Tak Pernah Padam". At the end of the day, the number of acts was cut to 72. On the second day, acts were given dance lessons by choreographers. The judges then split the number of acts down to two groups, 22 acts through to the next day, and remaining 50 acts must perform once again, with an a cappella performance.

The judges then went on to cut 24 acts. The 48 remaining acts were then given the task of learning one song, making it their own and performing it in front of judges. The judges then chose the final 24 acts, based on these performances. However, they finally chose 26 acts. At the end of the day, judges suggested that the Over 24s category be changed to 26 and Over, as the quality of older singers was high. The Boys and Girls categories then comprised singers aged 15 to 25, rather than 15 to 23. As the groups category was the weakest, four rejected soloists from the Boys category and four from the Girls category were asked to form two groups, as a Girlband, Ilusia Girls and a Boyband, Nu Dimension.

The 26 successful acts were:
Boys:  Adhi Permana, Dicky Adam, Dennis Martha, Gede Bagus, Mikha Angelo, Steven Fasly
Girls: Yohanna Febrianti, Shena Malsiana, Fatin Shidqia, Theresia Dina, Pratami Marja Jeliana, Melissa Putri, Nurul Fadhila
Over 26s: Agus Hafiluddin, Alex Rudiart, Novita Dewi, Syarifah Raykhan, Isa Raja, Taufik Hidayat, Lisa Sulistyowati, Dwi Soraya
Groups: Dalagita, Awan, Jad n Sugy, Nu Dimension, Ilusia Girls

Judges' home visit
The judges' home visit was the last stage of the selection process. The episode was aired on February 8. This was the debut episode for Anggun as judge and mentor on the show. During this stage, it was revealed that Dhani would mentor the Groups, Rossa would mentor the Girls, Anggun would mentor the Boys, and Bebi would mentor the Over-26s. The final selection process was aided by an assistant per category. Kevin Aprilio joined Dhani at Marina Batavia in Jakarta, Maia Estianty joined Rossa at her private-house in Jakarta, personnel of KLa Project, Lilo joined Anggun at Ubud in Bali, and Sandhy Sondoro joined Bebi at Eco Park in Ancol, Jakarta. At judges' home visit each act performed a song they personally picked and performed it in front of their mentor and his/her assistant.

Showcase and wildcard 
Showcase is the first live performance for the 12 acts who made it through to the Gala live show. Each mentor will introduce the acts who best they have to the public. Each act will perform one at a time to show their skills. At the beginning of showcase, it was announced that each judge could bring back one further act back as a wildcard. The public then voted for which of the four wildcards would become the thirteenth finalist. This left one judge with an extra act. Dhani chose Awan, Rossa chose Theresia Dina, Anggun chose Adhi Permana and Bebi chose Alex Rudiart. Alex was revealed as the thirteenth act in the end of showcase.

Contestants 

The top 13 contestants were confirmed as follows;

Key:
 – Winner
 – Runner-up
 – Third place

Gala live shows

Result summary 
Colour key

 Anggun was not required to vote as there was already a majority.
 There was no elimination on Week 9 as a part  of Kartini's day celebration. All the votes cast will be accumulated to the next week's show.

Gala live show details

Week 1 (February 22)
Theme: Mentor's choice
Group performance: "One More Night"
Musical guest: Sandhy Sondoro ("Tak Pernah Padam" / "End of The Time" / "Malam Biru")

Judges' decisions to save
Anggun: Dicky Adam – backed her own act
Dhani: Ilusia Girls – backed his own act
Bebi: Dicky Adam – thought Dicky Adam gave a massive progress than Ilusia Girls
Rossa: Ilusia Girls – believed Ilusia Girls has a "strength" in singing

With the acts in the bottom two receiving two votes each, the result was deadlocked and reverted to the earlier public vote. Dicky Adam was eliminated as the act with the fewest public votes.

Week 2 (March 1)
Theme: Songs from my mentor
Group performance: "I Gotta Feeling"
Musical guest: Slank ("Kuil Cinta")

Judges' decisions to save
Dhani: Dalagita – backed his own act
Bebi: Isa Raja – backed his own act
Anggun: Isa Raja – gave no reason
Rossa: Isa Raja – gave no reason

Week 3 (March 8)
Theme: My favourite song
Group performance: "Malam Ini Indah"
Musical guest: Cakra Khan ("Harus Terpisah")

Judges' decisions to save
Rossa: Yohanna Febrianti – backed her own act
Bebi: Isa Raja – backed his own act
Dhani: Yohanna Febrianti – gave no reason
Anggun: Isa Raja – gave no reason

With the acts in the bottom two receiving two votes each, the result was deadlocked and reverted to the earlier public vote. Yohanna Febrianti was eliminated as the act with the fewest public votes.

Week 4 (March 15)
Theme: Songs from 90's
Group performance: "Livin' la Vida Loca" / "Let's Get Loud" / "Smooth"
Musical guest: Anggun ("Bayang-Bayang Ilusi" / "Takut")

Judges' decisions to save
Anggun: Gede Bagus – backed her own act
Dhani: Ilusia Girls – backed his own act
Rossa: Gede Bagus – gave no reason
Bebi: Gede Bagus – believed Ilusia Girls will be more successful as solo artists after the show

Week 5 (March 22)
Theme: Mega Hits Indonesia
Group performance: "Masih Ada"
Musical guest: Ahmad Dhani ("Sabda Alam")

Judges' decisions to save
Rossa: Shena Malsiana – backed her own act who she felt has more "X" factor
Bebi: Agus Hafiluddin – backed his own act, stating that Agus gave a massive progress
Dhani: Shena Malsiana – gave no reason
Anggun: Shena Malsiana – gave no reason

Week 6 (March 29)
Theme: My musical inspiration
Group performance: "Let's Get It Started"
Musical guest: Regina Ivanova ("I Will Always Love You") and Judika ("Sweet Child o' Mine")

Judges' decisions to save
Anggun: Gede Bagus - backed her own act
Bebi: Alex Rudiart - backed his own act
Dhani: Gede Bagus - voted as a tribute to Gede's mom birthday
Rossa: Gede Bagus - chose to go with her heart and based her decision on the final showdown performances

Week 7 (April 5)
Theme: Hits of the century
Group performance: "Gangnam Style" / "Party Rock Anthem" / "Harlem Shake"
Musical guest: Ari Lasso ("Mengejar Matahari" / "Arti Cinta") and Tompi ("Menghujam Jantungku" / "Locked Out of Heaven")

Judges' decisions to save
Rossa: Mikha Angelo - gave no specific reason, though admitted that she adored both acts
Bebi: Mikha Angelo - admitted that Gede Bagus did well in the singoff but felt that the competition still needed Mikha
Dhani: Mikha Angelo - gave no reason
Anggun was not required to vote as there was already a majority

Week 8 (April 12)
Theme: East meets west
Group performance: "Tetap Semangat" / "I Love Rock 'n' Roll"
For the first time this season, each contestant performed two songs.

Judges' decisions to save
Dhani: Nu Dimension - backed his own act
Bebi: Isa Raja - backed his own act 
Rossa: Nu Dimension - stated that she loved their harmony in the singoff
Anggun: Isa Raja - adored both acts, but stated that she has been a fan of Isa Raja since the very beginning

With the acts in the bottom two receiving two votes each, the result was deadlocked and reverted to the earlier public vote. Isa Raja was eliminated as the act with the fewest public votes.

Week 9 (April 19)
Theme: Music of the women of Indonesia
Group performance: "Hanya Memuji"
The theme was billed as a part of Kartini's day celebrations. For the first time this season, each contestant performed in a duet with Indonesian female singer. It was also announced that the votes cast will be used for charity purpose.

 Neither Shena nor Mikha were sent home as the host then announced that both acts were safe. There was no elimination as a part of Kartini's day celebrations and the votes cast would still be counted for the following week.

Week 10 (April 26)
Theme: Mentor's choice; movie soundtrack
Group performance: "Ain't No Mountain High Enough"
Musical guest: Haley Reinhart ("Bennie and the Jets")

The Top 5 did not feature a final showdown and instead the act with the fewest public votes, Shena Malsiana, were automatically eliminated.

Week 11: Semi-final (May 3)
Theme: Contestant's choice (English-language songs); songs by Noah/Peterpan (billed as "night of the superstars")
Guest mentor: Noah
Group performance: "Khayalan Tingkat Tinggi"
Musical guest: Lenka ("Trouble Is a Friend") and Noah ("Hidup Untukmu Mati Tanpamu")

The semi-final did not feature a final showdown and instead the act with the fewest public votes, Mikha Angelo, were automatically eliminated.

Finals (May 10/17/24)

May 10
Theme: Viewers' choice; mentor duets; song of the season (billed as "road to the grand final")
Group performance: "It's My Life" and "Relax, Take It Easy" (with Mika)
Musical guest: Anggun ("Snow on the Sahara")

The viewers were allowed to choose two songs to be sung by the finalists via the official Facebook page from Saturday, May 4 to Monday, May 6. One song will be their favorite performance from the finalists within the competition and the other one will be a new song.

Notes
The lines were opened during the whole week and the act who finished at third place will be announced during the grand final on May 17, where the Top 2 will perform their winner's single for the very first time.

May 17
Theme: Superstar duets; no theme; winner's single (billed as the "grand final")
Group performance: "One Love"
Musical guest: Setia Band ("Lady Sky")

May 24
Group performance: "Smells Like Teen Spirit" / "My Favourite Things" / "Sang Dewi" / "You and I" / "Kiss from a Rose" / "Locked Out of Heaven" / "Time After Time" / "Mr. Brightside" / "Aku Bukan Bang Toyib" / "Ordinary World" / "Don't You Worry Child" / "Reach" (all finalists)

The winner announcement was held in Hall D2 JIExpo, Kemayoran, South Jakarta.

Notes
The judges also performed each other's single during the Result Show. Ahmad Dhani performed first by piano, singing Afgan's "Sadis" (written by Bebi Romeo), followed by Bebi Romeo performed Rossa's "Ayat Ayat Cinta" with a piano. Rossa then sang Anggun's "Mimpi" and Anggun took the stage last to perform Dewa 19's "Risalah Hati".
At the end of the Result Show, all finalists and judges performed USA for Africa's "We Are the World".

Reception

Ratings

Controversy
In week six of gala show, Ahmad Dhani and Rossa opted to send home Alex Rudiart in favor of Gede Bagus, causing the elimination of Alex Rudiart. This decision resulted in large amount of criticisms and outrages from the public, who claimed the decision as unfair. As a result, a lot of social media reactions begin to appear including several motion to boycott the show.

However, the Boikot group had little to no effect on the immense success of the first season and the hype (and ratings) continued to build cementing X Factor as a phenomenon in Indonesian TV history. The Boikot group was disbanded as a result of its inability to have any success.

References

External links
 Official website

Indonesia 01
Season 1
2012 Indonesian television seasons
2013 Indonesian television seasons